Castellum Minus was an ancient city located in the Roman province of Mauretania Caesariensis in today's northern Algeria.  The ancient city is identified with ruins near Coléa, Algeria, (at 35.3877778° latitude and 0.1416667° longitude).

The ancient town was also the seat of a Christian bishopric. Which remains today a titular see in the Roman Catholic Church.

References

Roman towns and cities in Mauretania Caesariensis